Eria Tutara-Kauika Raukura (1834–1938) was a New Zealand tribal tohunga. Of Māori descent, he identified with the Ngai Tahupo, Ngati Kahungunu and Tuhoe iwi. He was born in Te Papuni, Hawke's Bay, New Zealand in about 1834.

References

1830s births
1938 deaths
New Zealand Māori religious leaders
Tohunga
Ngāi Tūhoe people
Ngāti Kahungunu people